Write-downs on the value of loans, MBS and CDOs due to the subprime mortgage crisis.

Bloomberg, May 19, 2008
Bloomberg, August 12, 2008 (commentary )

References

2008 in economics
Subprime mortgage crisis